Shepherd University (Shepherd) is a public university in Shepherdstown, West Virginia. Accredited by the Higher Learning Commission, the university enrolled 3,159 students in Fall 2020.

History 

Shepherd University began when the county seat of Jefferson County, West Virginia, was moved from its temporary location in Shepherdstown back to Charles Town in July 1871. The people of Shepherdstown and vicinity decided to use the vacated courthouse for educational purposes. An article of incorporation for a school to be known as Shepherd College, designed to instruct students “in languages, arts and sciences,” was drawn up and signed by C. W. Andrews, Alexander R. Boteler, C. T. Butler, G. M. Beltzhoover, David Billmyer, Samuel Knott, and Henry Shepherd. This body of incorporators gave itself power to elect instructors, pay salaries, and prescribe courses of study. Professor Joseph McMurran was appointed first principal of the institution, which opened with 42 students in September 1871, under the authority of the board of trustees.

On February 27, 1872, the Legislature of West Virginia passed the following act: “That a branch of the State Normal School be and the same is hereby established at the building known as Shepherd College, in Shepherdstown, in the county of Jefferson.”

Shepherd became a four-year college for the training of teachers on July 1, 1930, at which time the institution began granting the bachelor of arts degree. Shepherd was authorized to implement liberal arts programs in 1943, and in 1950 the Bachelor of Science degree was added. Also in 1950 Shepherd was accredited by the North Central Association of Colleges and Schools and in 1951 it became a member of the Association of American Colleges. On April 7, 2004, Governor Bob Wise signed legislation allowing Shepherd College to change its name to Shepherd University.

In the past two decades, Shepherd has added 11 new buildings, including the $9 million Robert C. Byrd Science and Technology Center; the $18 million addition to the Scarborough Library, which also houses the Robert C. Byrd Center for Congressional History and Education; and the $10 million nursing classroom building. The $21.6 million Wellness Center opened on June 11, 2009, and includes a 25-yard, eight-lane pool; two basketball courts, and six basketball hoops; two racquetball courts, indoor elevated 1/10 mile jogging track; two multi-purpose rooms with mirrored wall for group exercise classes; 7,500+ square foot weight and fitness area as well as a dining venue operated by Shepherd's Dining Services.

Potomac Place, a new 298 bed dormitory on the West Campus, opened in August 2017.

Mary J. C. Hendrix was inaugurated as the sixteenth president of Shepherd University on April 8, 2016.

Campus

Ruth Scarborough Library 
The Ruth Scarborough Library collection contains varied materials, numbering 511,518 items. Printed and microtext materials compose the majority of the collection, including 164,206 printed books and bound periodicals as well as 200,474 in microfiche and microfilm. Other items in the collection include phonograph records, cassette tapes, DVDs, CDs, and video cassettes. The library currently subscribes to 521 periodicals and newspapers in paper, and it provides access to more than 12,000 periodicals in full-text. In addition, the library provides access to electronic databases and online indexing and abstracting services.

Since 1971, the library has been a selective repository for federal government publications and regularly receives West Virginia state government publications. The library houses a special collection of printed materials relating to state and regional history. The library's computerized catalog provides Web access to materials in the Scarborough collection, and the library maintains a Web site.

The Scarborough Library, originally built in 1965, was renovated in 2002–03. The library is a place of study and research for individuals and groups. The  expansion, dedicated in 2002, includes multimedia classrooms, additional reading areas and seating, and the Robert C. Byrd Center for Congressional History and Education whose purpose is to promote an understanding of the United States Congress and the Constitution through public programing, teacher training. The Byrd Center houses an archive containing the political papers of West Virginia's Senator Robert C. Byrd, Congressman Harley O. Staggers Sr., and Congressman Harley O. Staggers Jr., along with other related collections.

Contemporary American Theater Festival 
The Contemporary American Theater Festival is an annual festival of new plays by American playwrights, most often premieres or second or third productions. CATF focuses on plays that deal with contemporary issues that boldly challenge and entertain audiences.

Since 1991, CATF has produced 127 plays written by 90 playwrights, including 52 world premieres, 11 of which were commissioned. Adventurous audiences from 38 states, the District of Columbia, Canada, and Europe have attended the Theater Festival's productions. The plays are professionally produced using Actors' Equity Association's LORT D contract; CATF operates under agreements from AEA, United Scenic Artists, and the Society of Stage Directors and Choreographers.

George Tyler Moore Center for the Study of the Civil War 

The George Tyler Moore Center for the Study of the Civil War is home to Shepherd University's academic concentrations related to the Civil War and 19th Century America. The program requires students to complete specialized courses in addition to the courses already required of all history majors. Courses concentrate on various elements of 19th century history such as The American Civil War, 1850–1865; the Reconstruction Era; African American History; Soldiers and Society, 1861–65; and the Old South. Students also conduct primary research within the topic area and must intern at one of various historic sites in the region, such as Harpers Ferry National Historic Site.

The ongoing research mission at the George Tyler Moore Center for the Study of the Civil War involves the compilation of figures from the soldiers' compiled military service records which will lead to a more definitive number of veterans. Ongoing research includes gleaning data from the service records of soldiers serving in all of West Virginia's Union regiments and (Western) Virginia Confederate regiments was compiled in the center's electronic database. Once completed, a simple query will be able to provide a very accurate total for both sides including data heretofore unavailable to historians.

The center is headed by Civil War historian James J. Broomall.

Athletics 

Shepherd University athletic teams are known as the Rams. The university is a member of the NCAA Division II level of the National Collegiate Athletic Association (NCAA), primarily competing in the Pennsylvania State Athletic Conference (PSAC) since the 2019-2020 academic year. The Rams previously competed in the Mountain East Conference (MEC) from 2013–14 to 2018–19, and before that, the now-defunct West Virginia Intercollegiate Athletic Conference (WVIAC) from 1924–25 to 2012–13.

Shepherd fields 15 intercollegiate teams: Men's sports include baseball, basketball, cross country, football, golf, soccer and tennis; while women's sports include basketball, cross country, golf, lacrosse, soccer, softball, tennis and volleyball.

The Ram marching band, cheerleading squad, and dance team promote spirit at university home games. Home football and lacrosse games are played in Ram Stadium. Home baseball games are played at Fairfax Field.

In 2015, Shepherd advanced to the NCAA Division II football national championship game, losing to Northwest Missouri State University 34–7. In 2016, the Rams lost in the D-II semi-finals to North Alabama 23–13. In 2019, the Rams reached the NCAA Division II playoffs and lost in the second round to Slippery Rock University of Pennsylvania 50–31.

In 2021, Shepherd advanced to the Division II semi-finals for the third time since 2015, where they lost to Ferris State, 55–7.

On December 17, 2021, Junior QB Tyson Bagent won the Harlon Hill Trophy, awarded to the player of the year in Division II.

Notable alumni 

 John J. Cornwell, 15th governor of West Virginia
 Jill Upson, former and first African-American female Republican member of the West Virginia House of Delegates
 Sammi Brown, former member of the West Virginia House of Delegates
 John Doyle, member of the West Virginia House of Delegates
 Michael Folk, former member of the West Virginia House of Delegates
 Gina Marie Groh, attorney and federal judge
 Bob Holmes, attorney and member of the Georgia House of Representatives
 Eric Householder, member of the West Virginia House of Delegates
 George William Johnson, congressman
 Tiffany Lawrence, former member of the West Virginia House of Delegates
 Matt K. Lewis, political writer and podcaster
 Ronald F. Miller, former member of the West Virginia Senate
 David Plunkert, illustrator and graphic designer
 Arthur Edward Ruark, physicist
 Franke Wilmer, former member of the Montana House of Representatives

References

External links 

 
 Shepherd Athletics website

 
1871 establishments in West Virginia
Buildings and structures in Jefferson County, West Virginia
Education in Jefferson County, West Virginia
Educational institutions established in 1871
Public universities and colleges in West Virginia
Tourist attractions in Jefferson County, West Virginia
Schools of education in the United States
Public liberal arts colleges in the United States